Brokedown Palace is a 1999 American drama film directed by Jonathan Kaplan, and starring Claire Danes, Kate Beckinsale, Bill Pullman and Lim Kay Tong. It deals with two American friends imprisoned in Thailand for alleged drug smuggling. Its title is taken from a Grateful Dead song written by Jerry Garcia and Robert Hunter from their 1970 album American Beauty.

Plot
Lifelong best friends Alice Marano and Darlene Davis take a trip after graduating from high school, giving their parents the impression that they are going to Hawaii. However, Alice talks Darlene into going to Thailand instead, after comparing the prices of both destinations. Darlene agrees, albeit with some reluctance. Once in Thailand, they meet a captivating Australian man who calls himself Nick Parks. Unknown to them, Nick is a drug smuggler. Darlene is particularly smitten with Nick and persuades Alice to take him up on his offer to treat them both to a side trip to Hong Kong. While boarding their flight at Don Mueang International Airport, the girls are detained by the police. Alice and Darlene are shocked to discover that one of their bags contains heroin, which they insist must have been planted by Nick.

The two girls are interrogated by the Thai police and Darlene signs a confession written in Thai, believing it to be a transcript of her statement. At their trial, they beg for mercy and are sentenced to 33 years in prison, the judge choosing to show leniency and not issue the standard life sentence. In prison, the girls are advised to seek out Henry Greene, aka "Yankee Hank", an expatriate American attorney living in Thailand.

As the girls try to deal with the violence and squalor of prison, Hank begins work on their case. He tracks down another girl who had been used as an unwitting drug mule by a man named Skip K. Carn. Hank deduces that Carn and Parks are the same person, since each name is an anagram of the other, and that he planted the drugs and tipped off the Thai police about the girls as a distraction to make sure his other mules could avoid scrutiny. Warned that Parks has influential friends in the Thai government, Hank arranges a deal with a corrupt prosecutor to secure a pardon for the girls if they recant their claim about Parks' involvement and take full responsibility for smuggling the drugs. The girls agree, but the prosecutor double-crosses them on the deal. Realizing that Darlene will not survive their time in prison, Alice begs the King of Thailand to allow her to serve both sentences, which have been extended by 15 years after an escape attempt, in exchange for letting Darlene go. The deal is accepted and Darlene is released. She promises to continue working with Hank to try to free Alice. The film ends with the narration from Alice saying many people will not understand why she made this decision.

Cast

Production

Development 
Producer Adam Fields was inspired to make the film based on interviews he conducted with young American women serving life sentences in a Thailand prison for drug-related offenses, as well as with U.S. Embassy and Drug Enforcement Agency officials in Bangkok. Fields said the idea traces back to “'the self-assurance and naive arrogance I certainly had as an American teenager when I wanted to go to London or Amsterdam or Morocco and I said to my parents, ‘I’m 16, I’m grown up, I ride the New York subways--what could happen?’” Fields developed the story with screenwriter David Arata, who expanded it into a screenplay. 

Arata and director Jonathan Kaplan said a key emotional theme of the film is the friendship between the characters of Alice and Darlene. Said Kaplan, “You have this relationship between two young women that I’ve never seen on the screen before. And I just thought the script...treated them with so much respect. And I also think that when one girl [Danes’ Alice] is incredibly needy and doesn’t want to let go, and the other one [Beckinsale’s Darlene] is ready to go out into the world, it’s a major rite of passage that’s almost a death--and a very compelling story.”

Casting 
Claire Danes said she was drawn to the project because of its depiction of female friendship; she deferred her enrollment at Yale for a year to do the film. Bill Pullman signed on for the opportunity to shoot in the Philippines. “Last fall, when I was in Guadalcanal doing Terry Malick’s ‘The Thin Red Line’...I was seeing all these expatriates we were using as extras. And I got really curious about what it is to live outside your own country," Pullman said.

Filming 
Because the film presents a critical view of the Thai legal system, most of the scenes were filmed in the Philippines. However, some panoramas and views were filmed in Bangkok. Ninoy Aquino International Airport Terminal 1 was used as a stand in for Don Mueang International Airport.

The prison scenes were shot inside the Sanctuary Center for Psychotic Female Vagrants, a mental asylum for women operated by the DSWD in Mandaluyong, Manila. A makeshift wall was erected down the site's grounds and filming took place in one half. Real inmates were crammed in the other half during the shoot. Amanda de Cadenet, who has a role in the film as a prisoner, recounted how disgruntled patients would sometimes throw feces over the dividing wall in protest. Meanwhile, Claire Danes told a publication that scenes were often interrupted by wailing women.

Claire Danes caused controversy when she made derogatory comments regarding Manila during filming. In an interview for the April 1998 issue of Vogue, Danes called the city "ghastly and weird". Kim Atienza, a Manila city council member, dismissed these initial comments, reasoning they "could be chalked up as 'mere irresponsible statements of youth.'" Months later for the October issue of Premiere magazine, Danes further commented, "[Manila] just smelled like cockroaches", "there’s no sewage system and the people do not have anything", "[we saw] people with like, no arms, no legs, no eyes, no teeth", and “rats were everywhere." After these comments, Atienza and council members voted for a resolution to ban Danes and her films in Manila, a ban which has not been lifted. Danes issued an apology, explaining "because of the subject matter of 'Brokedown Palace,' the cast was exposed to the darker and more impoverished places of Manila,” rather than the tourist-friendly areas. She added that her comments were only meant to reflect the locations, not her attitudes towards the Filipino people, whom she said were "nothing but warm, friendly and supportive."

Reception 
On review aggregator website Rotten Tomatoes, Brokedown Palace has an approval rating of 31% based on 35 critics’ reviews, with the consensus stating that the movie "lacks credibility and tension".

Roger Ebert gave the film three out of four stars, saying, "The heart of the film is in the performances of Danes and Beckinsale". Stephen Holden of The New York Times wrote "Although the basic premise of the movie is similar to that of the better, more complex 'Return to Paradise,' which was set in Malaysia, ‘Brokedown Palace’, which tells the story of Alice's redemption from brattiness to something verging on martyrdom, rides on the steady emotional current of Ms. Danes' fine performance." He concluded the film "is good enough so that you wish it were better. Because the character of Darlene never comes into focus, the central theme of a close friendship put to the ultimate test isn't as compelling as it ought to be", and "at the very least, [the film] offers a disturbing reminder that being a willfully ignorant ugly American abroad with an attitude could be a recipe for disaster."

The film was a box-office disappointment, grossing only $10 million worldwide on a $25 million budget.

See also
 Midnight Express (film)
 Return to Paradise (1998 film)

References

External links
 
 
 
 Production stills at Adam Fields Productions

1999 films
1999 drama films
1990s prison films
American prison drama films
1990s English-language films
Films scored by David Newman
Films about drugs
Films about miscarriage of justice
Films about vacationing
1990s female buddy films
Films directed by Jonathan Kaplan
Films set in Australia
Films set in Bangkok
Films set in Hong Kong
Films set in the Philippines
Films set in Thailand
Films about heroin addiction
Thai-language films
Women in prison films
Films shot in Australia
Films shot in Bangkok
Films shot in Hong Kong
Films shot in Metro Manila
Films shot in Thailand
Films shot in the Philippines
Film controversies in Thailand
1990s American films